Borgo San Michele is one of the frazioni of Latina, Lazio situated over eight kilometres from the provincial capital Latina. Its population was 1971 in 2013.

References

External links
San Michele's parish church website in Italian

Latina, Lazio